The Cave Spring Commercial Historic District in Cave Spring, Georgia is a  historic district which was listed on the National Register of Historic Places in 1980.  The listing included 12 contributing buildings and a contributing site.

It includes the intersections of Alabama Road, Broad Street, Rome Road, Cedartown Road, and Padlock Street, and extends about a block in each direction.

References

Historic districts on the National Register of Historic Places in Georgia (U.S. state)
National Register of Historic Places in Floyd County, Georgia
Greek Revival architecture in Georgia (U.S. state)
Early Commercial architecture in the United States